Major Alfred Whitmore (1876–1946) was an English pathologist who, together with C.S. Krishnaswami, identified Burkholderia pseudomallei, the causative agent of melioidosis (also known as "Whitmore's disease") in opium addicts in Rangoon in 1911. He differentiated it from Burkholderia mallei, the causative agent of glanders, by clinical and microbiological features.

He was initially a Captain, and later a Major, in the Indian Medical Service. Later, he also became director of the Rangoon Medical School.

References

1876 births
1946 deaths
British pathologists
Indian Medical Service officers